"Cross My Heart" is a song recorded by English pop band Eighth Wonder. It was the second single from the album Fearless and the group's sixth single. It proved to be almost as successful chartwise as "I'm Not Scared", reaching the top ten in Italy, Norway and Switzerland, and the top twenty in France, Germany and United Kingdom. It was a minor success in the US, peaking at number 56, but remains the band's only American top 75 hit single. The video was directed by Dieter 'Dee' Trattmann. The song was also notably recorded by American singer Martika.

Overview
Songwriter Michael Jay says the track was originally written for Martika, who he was planning to produce and launch as a pop star. However, his publishing deal at the time required that his songs not be withheld exclusively for one artist, and were to be shopped around for placement with other acts. Eighth Wonder's version of "Cross My Heart" followed Tracie Spencer's January 1988 version which featured on her self-titled debut album. During that year, the song was also released by Martika on her eponymous debut album. Also in 1988, Hong Kong pop singer Sandy Lam recorded a Cantonese version of the song, titled "Once We've Touched (一接觸)" for her sixth album City Rhythm.

Track listings
These are the formats and track listings of major single releases of "Cross My Heart":

 7" single
 "Cross My Heart" — 3:26
 "Let Me In" — 4:35

 12" maxi 1
 "Cross My Heart" (dance mix) — 7:06     
 "Cross My Heart" — 3:26
 "Let Me In" — 4:35

 12" maxi 2
 "Cross My Heart" (club mix) — 6:50
 "Cross My Heart" (house mix) — 7:29
 "Cross My Heart" (dub mix) — 6:00

 CD maxi
 "Cross My Heart" (dance mix) — 7:08
 "Cross My Heart" — 3:27
 "Let Me In" — 4:37
 "Cross My Heart" (instrumental) — 4:31

Credits
 Design – Stylorouge
 Photography – Eamon J. McCabe
 Edited by Chep Nunez
 Engineer assistant – Jeff Abikzer
 Engineer (remix) – Hugo Dwyer
 Keyboards – Mac Quayle
 Producer – Pete Hammond
 Remix – "Little" Louie Vega

Charts

References

1988 singles
Eighth Wonder songs
Martika songs
Tracie Spencer songs
CBS Records singles
1988 songs